Gábor Talmácsi (born 28 May 1981 in Budapest, Hungary) is a Hungarian former professional motorcycle racer. He was the 2007 125cc World Champion, and he is the first and only Hungarian to win a road racing World Championship. He has a younger brother, Gergő, who is also a motorcycle racer. Due to a leg injury suffered in 2013, Talmácsi has retired from racing professionally. After retiring from racing, he set up his own team Talmácsi Racing, which competed in the European Superstock 600 Championship and raced with Honda CBR600RRs, until the series folded at the end of 2015.

Career

Early career
Talmácsi also competed in boxing, but started racing on minibikes made by his father at the age of 4. In the 1995 Hungarian 125cc national championships he finished in 2nd, and in 1996 he won the title, opening the doors for not just national, but international championships as well. In 1997 he competed in the European 125cc Championship, finishing the race held at the Hungaroring in 4th place, attracting further attention. He continued in the series in 1998, without further success, and switched to the Alps Adriatic Championship in 1999, winning a race in the championship. In 2000, he raced again in the European Championship, and was sponsored the German IVETRA team, which allowed him to ride for a team with a better bike, and Talmácsi delivered the results. With several podium finishes in the year, and finishing the season 5th in the rider's championship, Talmácsi was able to gain enough sponsors to compete in Grand Prix racing from next season onwards.

125cc World Championship (2001-2008)

Racing Service Team (2001)
Talmácsi had his first full Grand Prix season in 2001, with the Racing Service team, on a private Honda RS125R bike. He started the year with 4 non-point scoring finishes, but improved as the season went on, eventually finishing in the points six times, three times in the top-10, with his season's best being a 6th place in Motegi. He ended the year 18th overall with 34 points, which earned him a place on the Italjet team for next season.

PEV ADAC Sachsen Team (2002)
The change wasn't a real success with no points in five races, and during the 2002 season, Talmácsi switched to the PEV ADAC Sachsen team, where he could ride a Honda again. This lineup worked a bit better, as he would score a 15th place in Assen, a 15th place in Valencia, an 11th place in Brno, and his best result in the category yet, with a brilliant 4th place in Brazil. He ended the year 22nd in the rider's championship, with 20 points.

Exalt Cycle Aprilia Team (2003)
In 2003 he signed for the reigning world champion Exalt Cycle Aprilia team, to partner teammate Steve Jenkner. Although not challenging for wins like his teammate, Talmácsi still had a much improved year, with consistent top-10 finishes (seven times), and a career high 70 points in the championship, which was good enough for 14th overall.

Malaguti (2004)
Talmácsi joined the factory Malaguti team for the 2004 season, wishing to be the leading rider at a team. However, the bike was not competitive at all, and his teammate Manuel Manna failed to score a single point during the season. Talmácsi fared better, scoring two 13th places in Mugello and Donnington, an 11th place at Phillip Island, a 9th place in Valencia, two 8th places in Motegi and Sepang, and a 7th place in Estoril. He finished 17th in the championship with 43 points, and his results with a weaker bike attracted the attention of teams like Derbi, Gilera, Honda and KTM.

KTM (2005)
Joining the Red Bull KTM team for 2005 gave Talmácsi the real breakthrough year, scoring his career's maiden podium in the third race of the season at Shanghai. Two races later in Mugello, he inherited his first victory, after a last lap fall from KTM teammate Mika Kallio and Héctor Faubel saw him cross the finish line first. A 4th place in Catalonia was followed by another victory in Assen, and a 4th place in Germany. Talmácsi won his third race in Qatar, which became infamous for his last lap overtaking of his teammate Mika Kallio. With four races to go, the Finn still had a real chance to beat Thomas Lüthi for the title, and Talmácsi only had mathematical chance, so the team asked the Hungarian rider to help his teammate score as many points as possible. After safely following him during the entire race, on the last lap Talmácsi overtook Kallio, and later claimed at the post race press conference, that he thought they still had one more lap to go. He had already been offered a contract by the manufacturer to race their factory 250cc KTM bike the forthcoming season, but after this incident the offer was withdrawn, giving the bikes to Manuel Poggiali and Hiroshi Aoyama instead. This incident became all the more painful for Kallio, after he was beaten by Lüthi in the title fight by only five points: the exact difference in the championship points gained by the first place and second place riders. Lüthi finished the season with 242 points and 4 wins, Kallio with 237 points and also 4 wins, but would have been 5 if not for the last second overtake in Qatar, thus winning the championship by more victories during countback. Talmácsi finished the season 3rd in the standings, with 198 points, three wins, one 2nd place, one 3rd place, and was not given a new contract by KTM.

Humangest Honda Racing Team (2006)
Inspired by the fact that the last three world champions in the class all rode Hondas, he accepted the offer of the Humangest Honda team, to ride a fully factory bike. But the Japanese manufacturer barely developed their 125cc bike for the new season following Lüthi's championship the year prior, so Aprilia had a big competitive advantage, which could be seen in the season's results. Álvaro Bautista became world champion easily, beating Kallio on the KTM by 76 points, and his own Aprilia teammates by 146 points. Talmácsi managed a season's best finish of 3rd in Brno, the closest race to a "home" Grand Prix, but that was the most he could get out of his bike. He finished the season 7th overall with 119 points, and as the best Honda rider, scoring six points more than 2005's champion and fellow Honda rider Lüthi.

World Champion at Aspar Aprilia (2007)
Coming into his 7th season of the 125cc category, he was given an offer from Jorge "Aspar" Martínez's team to ride one of their bikes in 2007, replacing outgoing world champion Bautista. Team Aspar was arguably the best team in the class, they gave the world champion in 2006, and also won the teams' competition. Talmácsi raced with a previously developed Aprilia engine, the so-called RSW, while his Spanish teammates, Héctor Faubel and Sergio Gadea used the new RSA engine, which proved to be a bit faster but less reliable than the older one. Mattia Pasini's 2007 season demonstrated the low reliability of the engine, with his motor problems forcing him to retire from five of the first seven races at the beginning of the season. This may have cost him the world championship title, because later with the engine upgrade, he showed great competitiveness, scoring four wins.

The season started very positively for Talmácsi. After a successful testing period, he started with a 2nd place in the opening race of Qatar, then he won the race in Jerez, overtaking Lukáš Pešek of Derbi just before the finish line. In the third race held at Istanbul Park Circuit he ended fifth after a small incident with Raffaele de Rosa, but increased his lead in the World Championship, due to his opponents finishing behind him (Héctor Faubel suffered from a clash with de Rosa and finished in 10th due to an overly aggressive maneuver from the Italian, Pesek finished in 6th, while Gadea and Pasini both retired).
On his 100th GP race in Shanghai, he finished fourth, a result he would repeat in both Le Mans, and Mugello. This cost him the championship lead, with Lukáš Pešek grabbing his maiden win in China, and finishing 2nd in France. In Barcelona his two main rivals at the time, Faubel and Pešek, crashed into each other while Talmácsi finished 2nd, again leading the world championship by 13 points. In the next grand prix at Donington, he could not finish the race due to an engine issue, and had to retire from the race, the only race he did not finish during the season. In Assen he finished 3rd behind Mattia Pasini and Héctor Faubel.

The German GP at the Sachsenring was the race most dominantly won by Talmácsi in 2007, with pole position, fastest lap of the race, and a formidable advantage throughout the whole grand prix. In Brno, there were about 30,000 Hungarian supporters traveling to see him win, and his performance appeared to be quite dominant with a pole position on Saturday, however in the race he could not ride as fast as expected, and had many tough battles further slowing him down, in the end finishing the race in 4th place, while Faubel won. The race at Misano was a dramatic one, as in the penultimate lap of the race Simone Corsi, Héctor Faubel and Gábor Talmácsi were all battling for second place, the race was led comfortably by Mattia Pasini. Corsi and Faubel crashed, while Talmácsi could keep going and finished the race in 2nd place, again leading the championship before Faubel, who did not score any points, finishing the race in 17th place. The race in Estoril was another dramatic race, with Héctor Faubel taking the victory, overtaking Talmácsi after the last corner, in his slipstream. In Motegi the race was held in wet conditions, and was won by Pasini, with Talmácsi coming in second, and Faubel in third.

With three races remaining, Talmácsi had his worst race of the season (besides the United Kingdom where his engine problem impeded him from finishing), in Australia, where he had problems with finding the right setup for the new suspension of his motorcycle. He finished in 8th place, and kept only a single point of his lead against Héctor Faubel, who finished in third behind Lukáš Pešek and Joan Olivé. At Sepang, the penultimate race of the season, Faubel had pole position with Talmácsi starting second. Getting a better start and having better pace throughout the whole race, the Hungarian rider lead from the end of the first lap until the end of the race, with a significant advantage over the other riders. Faubel finished third, Japanese KTM rider Tomoyoshi Koyama coming in second. The last race of the season at Valencia saw Talmácsi come into the weekend with a 10-point advantage, and needed to finish on the podium if Faubel won. Talmácsi started from pole, and in an absolutely tense race where Faubel tried everything, including backing them up into fellow Spanish Aspar Aprilia rider Sergio Gadea, but Talmácsi hung on to second place (third still would have been enough by one point if Gadea passed him), finishing just behind his rival race-winner Faubel, and became the 2007 125cc World Champion. He became the first motorcycle World Champion of Hungary, and the first from the central-eastern region of Europe. The party to celebrate his success back in Budapest, Hungary was known as "Talmageddon", a word play between Talmácsi and Armageddon, and was also named 2007 Hungarian Sportsman of the Year for his achievements.

Bancaja Aspar Team Aprilia (2008)
Talmácsi signed a two-year contract with the Aspar Team, to race in their 125cc team in 2008 with an RSA Aprilia motorcycle, and move to the 250cc team of Jorge "Aspar" Martínez in 2009. 2008 did not start well for him, with a 12th place in Qatar, and a retirement in Jerez, but he improved steadily throughout the season, finishing the year with three victories in Assen, Misano, and Sepang, a 2nd place in Mugello, and five 3rd places in China, Barcelona, Germany, Japan, and Australia. He finished 3rd in the standings, with 206 points.

MotoGP World Championship

Scot Racing Team (2009)
Talmácsi started the 2009 season in the 250cc class, but left Aspar's Balatonring Team after only three races following a row over image rights, firing his manager Stefano Favaro in the process as well. His three results were all top-10 finishes, opening the season with a 10th place in Qatar, then a 4th place in the Japanese Grand Prix, and finally a 7th place in Jerez. Having gained the backing of Hungarian oil company MOL Group, Talmácsi moved to Scot Racing Team in MotoGP, from the sixth race of the season onwards. He initially joined the team as the teammate of Yuki Takahashi, but from Laguna Seca on, Talmácsi was the one and only rider of Team Scot. He scored his first MotoGP point in Germany, and he finished eight consecutive races in the points from Germany to Malaysia. His best result was 12th in Donington, finishing ahead of notable riders Chris Vermeulen, Casey Stoner and Nicky Hayden in wet conditions. Talmácsi finished his debut season in the Premier Class with 19 points, and 17th in the rider's championship.

Moto2 World Championship

Fimmco Speed Up (2010)
Realizing that MotoGP was a step too far, Talmácsi returned to the newly named Moto2 intermediate class (replacing 250cc bikes were 600cc four-stroke bikes), for the 2010 season. He got a contract offer from Speed Up to race alongside Andrea Iannone. Talmácsi accepted, and had an okay season, scoring regular high point finishes, but only stood on the podium once, a 3rd place in Aragón. He ended the year with one pole position from Estoril, and 6th in the rider's championship, with 109 points.

G22 Racing Team (2011)
Originally planning to sign with G22 for the 2011 season, Talmácsi announced in February that terms could not be agreed upon, and that he would not be racing in the Moto2 season. His ex-manager Stefano Favaro criticized the G22 Team for choosing to go with Łukasz Wargala instead, who crashed out in his first race, and did not qualify for the second race, being outside the minimum time requirement in qualifying. Following this embarrassment, G22 fired Wargala, and signed Carmelo Morales instead. According to Favaro, Talmácsi had another contract offer which he declined in December 2010, which was a big mistake, as at age 30, he couldn't afford to miss a full season. Talmácsi and his new manager could not find a ride for 2012 either.

Supersport World Championship & retirement (2013)
Talmácsi got back to racing in the 2013 Supersport World Championship, but in his first six races, he only scored points in one, a 12th-place finish in Donington Park. In the next race at the Portimão Circuit, Talmácsi had an engine failure, and a part of the engine blew up, shattering off a piece of metal that hit his shin, instantly breaking his Tibia. "My doctor explained what has happened to my leg, it is basically as if it had been fired at from close range with a pistol, the engine block exploded with such force. Doctors also found a dead muscle part, and I woke up to the fact that 70 to 80 percent of the anterior muscle from my leg had been removed because it was dead. This was because the muscle was simply hit too hard by the impact part. By the way, this muscle is responsible for being able to move my foot up, so I can't do that right now,” he said in an interview. He announced his retirement from motorcycle racing following the incident, no longer having the necessary strength in his legs to perform at an elite level.

Team owner in Superstock 600 (2014-2015)
For the 2014 season, Talmácsi has entered his own team, Talmácsi Racing, into the European Superstock 600 Championship, fielding current Moto2 rider Alessandro Zaccone, and Richárd Bódis. For 2015, he fielded only Zaccone, and the Superstock 600 series folded after the 2015 championship.

Career statistics

Grand Prix motorcycle racing

By season

By class

Races by year
(key) (Races in bold indicate pole position, races in italics indicate fastest lap)

Supersport World Championship

Races by year
(key) (Races in bold indicate pole position, races in italics indicate fastest lap)

References

External links

 Official forum (in English and Hungarian)
 News, blog (in Hungarian)
 Fan Club (in Hungarian)

1981 births
125cc World Championship riders
250cc World Championship riders
Moto2 World Championship riders
MotoGP World Championship riders
Sportspeople from Budapest
Living people
Hungarian motorcycle racers
Hungarian rally drivers
Porsche Supercup drivers
Supersport World Championship riders
125cc World Riders' Champions